Federico Hernán Domínguez (born 13 August 1976 in Buenos Aires, Argentina) is an Argentine former footballer who last played for the Uruguayan side Montevideo Wanderers.

Career
Domínguez began his professional career with Vélez Sarsfield, where he won the Copa Libertadores in 1994. He played the 1998/1999 season with Spanish Espanyol, but returned to Vélez to play until 2002. That year he moved to Independiente.

Domínguez joined Mexican Santos Laguna after playing the first half of the 2003/2004 season with Spanish Second Division Leganés. Joining Santos for the 2004 Clausura, Domínguez immediately became an important player, starting 15 of 19 games for the club and scoring one goal. He repeated his performance in the Apertura of that year, appearing in 13 games and scoring twice.

Between 2004 and 2007 Domínguez played for River Plate and he played for Gimnasia y Esgrima de La Plata between 2007 and 2008.

In 2008, he joined Cypriot side Apollon Limassol, where he played 3 matches before leaving citing personal reasons. He returned to South America to join Nacional of Uruguay.

In 2009, he was signed by new Argentinos Juniors manager Claudio Borghi and became an important member of the Argentinos Juniors team that won the Clausura 2010 championship. He played in 15 of the club's 19 games during their championship winning campaign and was one of the few players in the team to have any previous championship winning experience.

National team statistics

Titles
Argentina U-20
FIFA World Youth Championship (1): 1995

Vélez Sársfield
 Argentine Primera División (3): Apertura 1995, Clausura 1996, Clausura 1998
 Copa Libertadores (1): 1994

Independiente
 Argentine Primera División (1): Apertura 2002

Argentinos Juniors
 Argentine Primera División (1): Clausura 2010

External links 
 Argentine Primera statistics

1976 births
Living people
Sportspeople from Lanús
Argentine footballers
Argentina youth international footballers
Argentina under-20 international footballers
Argentina international footballers
Argentine Primera División players
Club Atlético Independiente footballers
Liga MX players
Santos Laguna footballers
Club Atlético River Plate footballers
Club Atlético Vélez Sarsfield footballers
Argentinos Juniors footballers
Club de Gimnasia y Esgrima La Plata footballers
Olimpo footballers
Uruguayan Primera División players
Club Nacional de Football players
Montevideo Wanderers F.C. players
La Liga players
Segunda División players
RCD Espanyol footballers
CD Leganés players
Cypriot First Division players
Apollon Limassol FC players
Argentine expatriate footballers
Argentine expatriate sportspeople in Spain
Expatriate footballers in Spain
Expatriate footballers in Mexico
Expatriate footballers in Uruguay
Expatriate footballers in Cyprus
Association football defenders